Events from the year 1749 in Ireland.

Incumbent
Monarch: George II

Events
3 June – radical apothecary Charles Lucas begins publication of The Censor, or Citizens' Journal in Dublin.
August–September – Charles Wesley makes his second visit to Ireland.
16 October – the Irish House of Commons threatens Charles Lucas with prosecution and he is forced to flee.
James Simon's An essay towards an historical account of Irish coins is published in Dublin.

Births
22 January – John Barclay, soldier, politician, jurist and businessman in America (died 1824)
July – Jocelyn Deane, politician (died 1780)
Robert Barber, quartermaster on HMS Adventure during the second voyage of James Cook (died 1783)
Thomas Burke, artist (died 1815)
William Richardson, landowner and politician (died 1822)
Edward Smyth, sculptor (died 1812)
James Whitelaw, historian, writer, statistician and philanthropist (died 1813)
Approximate date – Brian Merriman, Irish language poet (died 1805)

Deaths
3 January – John Ussher, politician (born 1703)
22 January – Matthew Concanen, writer, poet and lawyer (born 1701)
20 February (hanged at Tyburn) – Usher Gahagan, classical scholar.
May – Samuel Boyse, poet (born 1702/3)
21 September – Sir John Bingham, 5th Baronet, politician (born 1690)
Approximate date – Eamonn Laidir Ó Flaithbertaigh, Jacobite.

References

 
Years of the 18th century in Ireland
Ireland
1740s in Ireland